Kharestan-e Olya (also Romanized as Khārestān-e ‘Olyā and Khārastān ‘Olyá; also known as Khārestān and Khārestān-e Bālā) is a village in Dezhkord Rural District, Sedeh District, Eqlid County, Fars Province, Iran. At the 2006 census, its population was 255, in 64 families.

References 

Populated places in Eqlid County